Varbanov is a Bulgarian masculine surname, its feminine counterpart is Varbanova. Notable people with the surname include:

Aleksandar Varbanov (born 1964), Bulgarian weightlifter
Ivo Varbanov (born 1987), Bulgarian football player
Ivo Varbanov (born 1972), Bulgarian pianist and professional winemaker 
Marin Varbanov (1932–1989), Bulgarian artist
Nikolay Varbanov (born 1985), Bulgarian basketball player
Ventsislav Varbanov (born 1962), Bulgarian politician
Yordan Varbanov (born 1980), Bulgarian footballer

Bulgarian-language surnames